Cirsium brachycephalum is a species of flowering plant belonging to the family Asteraceae.

Its native range is Eastern Central and Southeastern Europe.

References

brachycephalum